Powerlight is the twelfth studio album by American band Earth, Wind & Fire, released in February 1983 by Columbia Records. The album rose to No. 4 on the Billboard Top R&B Albums chart and No. 12 on the Billboard 200 chart. Powerlight was also certified Gold in the US by the RIAA.

Overview
Powerlight was produced by EWF leader Maurice White. According to White the LP's title has to do with "the chakras -- the centers of the body that connect us with cosmic power." Artists such as Robert Greenidge, Maxayn Lewis and Zakir Hussain also appeared on the album.

Singles
The album cut "Fall in Love with Me" rose to No. 17 on the Billboard Hot 100 chart and No. 4 on the Billboard Hot R&B Songs chart. "Fall in Love with Me" was also Grammy nominated for Best R&B Performance by a Duo or Group with Vocals.

As well another single entitled "Side by Side" got to No. 15 upon the Billboard Hot R&B Songs chart. "Straight From The Heart" was released as a single in the Netherlands.

Critical reception

Robert Palmer of The New York Times noted "Mr. (Milton) Nascimento, and Brazilian pop in general, combine African-derived rhythms that tend to be more flowing and buoyant than their North American funk counterparts with a melodious pop lyricism based on relatively complex, jazzy harmonies, and Maurice White has done something very similar on Earth, Wind and Fire's Powerlight album." Vanity Fair found that "Earth, Wind & Fire's oddysey of uplift, Powerlight is, impossible as it may seem, even more relentlessly cheerful than its predecessor Raise!, a concoction designed to do precisely that to listeners' spirit". Tony Price of the Daily Mirror called Powerlight the LP of the Week exclaiming "The worst you can say about Earth, Wind & Fire are their high standards of arrangements are predictable. They just can't get any better!" Robert Christgau of the Village Voice proclaimed with an A− grade that "Their sonic affluence and showtime groove encompass whispering strings no less perfect than their JB guitar beats, Funkafunnies harmonies no less schmaltzy than their Lionel Richie homages, and when the synthesis is this catchy it's the best argument for universalism they'll ever make." Connie Johnson of the Los Angeles Times wrote Powerlight "does show why EWF is one of the masters of studio pop." Johnson added "EWF mostly keeps the rhetoric in check focusing instead on assertive rockers that give everyone in this nine-member unit a chance to flex his muscles There is less cosmic emphasis but the EWF formula—heavy on the richly textured vocals horns and rhythm—is still intact. And surprisingly still fresh."

With a 3 out of 5 stars rating, Ken Tucker of the Philadelphia Inquirer wrote "Earth, Wind and Fire's new collection of Utopian funk, "Powerlight" (Columbia), has a glossy sheen that manages to coat even the banal songs with a pretty surface that's pleasing." Chip Stern of Musician claimed "Powerlight stands both as a testament to White's absolute mastery of production and EW&F's renewed vigour as a band." Charles McCollum of the Hartford Courant said Powerlight "is the best set the group has produced in some time, with an often heady mixture of American pop stylings and in something new from (Maurice) White Brazilian textures." David Hepworth of Smash Hits gave the album an 8/10 rating and declared EWF are "firing on all cylinders." Hepworth added "They weld their massive sound together with such precision that their whole ensemble can provide a rhythm as spare and compulsive as a snapping finger, they write production numbers instead of songs and never allow the momentum to flag for a second, they're soppy as hell and, when they produce records like 'Powerlight', there's absolutely nothing wrong with that". Hugh Wyatt of the New York Daily News found "Earth, Wind & Fire gives new meaning to the word classy, and I like it".

Issac Hayes called Powerlight one of Earth, Wind & Fire's five essential recordings. Powerlight was also placed by music critic Robert Christgau of the Village Voice at No. 36 on his dean's list of 1983.

Track listing

Credits and personnel
Ms. Pluto - additional backing vocals 
Beloyd Taylor - additional backing vocals, guitar 
Verdine White - bass guitar
Douglas Davis, Earl Madison, Frederick Seykora - larums, percussion 
Fred White - drums, percussion
Roland Bautista - rhythm guitar
Dorothy Remsen
Keyboards - Eduardo Del Barrio, Rick Kelly, Skip Scarborough, Wayne Vaughn, George Del Barrio
Lead & backing vocals, percussion - Philip Bailey
Lead & backing vocals, drums, kalimba - Maurice White
Percussion - Paulinho Da Costa, Ralph Johnson
Piano - Maxanne Lewis
Synthesizer (Prophet-5) - Azar Lawrence 
Saxophone - Donald Myrick
Steel drums - Robert Greenidge
Synthesizer programming - Larry Dunn
Tabla - Zakir Hussain
Tenor saxophone - Andrew Woolfolk
Trombone - Bill Reichenbach Jr., Charles Loper, George Bohanon, Lew McCreary, Louis Satterfield
Trumpet - Chuck Findley, Gary Grant, Michael Harris, Oscar Brashear, Rahmlee Michael Davis, Jerry Hey
Viola - Alan Deveritch, Allan Harshman, Carole Mukogawa, David Schwartz, Joel Soultanian, Linn Subotnick, Milton Kestenbaum, Pamela Goldsmith, Roland Karo, Rollice Dale
Violin - Anatol Kaminsky, Arnold Belnick, Bill Hybel, Bob Sanov, Brenton Banks, George Kast, Haim Shtrum, Harry Bluestone, Janet Lakatos, Karen Jones, Marshall Sosson, Miwako Watanabe, Myer Bello, Nathan Ross, Nicole Bush, Pam Tompkins, Robert Lipsett, Robert Sushel, Ron Clark, Shari Zippert, Sheldon Sanov, Stanley Plummer

Production
Strings arranged - Bill Meyers & George Del Barrio
Horns arranged - Jerry Hey, George Del Barrio & Bill Meyers
Art Direction - Monte White & Roger Carpenter
Illustration - Shusei Nagaoka
Concertmaster - Assa Drori, David Frisina
Assistant Engineers - Robert Spano & Steve Crimmel
Mastered - Bernie Grundman
Additional Mixing - Tom Perry
Production Staff - Geri White, Leonard Smith & Monte White
Steel drums - Rudolph Charles
Producer - Maurice White
Recorded & Mixed - Mick Guzauski
Composer, keyboards, piano - Eddie del Barrio
Horn arrangement, keyboards - George del Barrio

Charts and certifications

Charts

Albums

Singles

Certifications

Accolades

References

1983 albums
Earth, Wind & Fire albums
Albums produced by Maurice White
Columbia Records albums
Albums with cover art by Shusei Nagaoka